"Jimmy Recard" is the first single released by Australian hip hop artist, Drapht, taken from his third album, Brothers Grimm. "Jimmy Recard" received airplay on radio stations across Australia. In an interview with Triple J, Drapht explained how he came up with the name.I was thinking of successful names so I jumped on the net and actually googled successful names and came up with James and Recard. So I changed James to Jimmy and used Recard as the last name. I think a name does a lot for a character and where you go in life. And it was a positive track on the record because a lot of my stuff kind of feeds from negative ideas.

The single reached #1 on the AIR Charts and #10 in Triple J's Hottest 100 for 2008. The single also broke into the top 100 in the ARIA Charts reaching #92.

Music video
The music video was produced by Moving Still Productions.

Charts

Certifications

References

2008 songs
2008 debut singles
Drapht songs
Obese Records singles